Bai Yan and Wu Di were the defending champions but only Bai chose to defend his title, partnering Riccardo Ghedin. They won the title after defeating Denys Molchanov and Aleksandr Nedovyesov 4–6, 6–3, [10–6] in the final.

Seeds

Draw

References
 Main Draw

Kunming Open - Men's Doubles